The 2003 Manitoba general election was held on June 3, 2003 to elect Members of the Legislative Assembly of the Province of Manitoba, Canada. It was won by the New Democratic Party, which won 35 seats out of 57.  The Progressive Conservative Party finished second with twenty seats.  The Liberal Party won two seats.

Results

|- style="background:#ccc;"
! rowspan="2" colspan="2" style="text-align:left;"|Party
! rowspan="2" style="text-align:left;"|Party leader
!rowspan="2"|Candidates
! colspan="4" style="text-align:center;"|Seats
! colspan="3" style="text-align:center;"|Popular vote
|- style="background:#ccc;"
| style="text-align:center;"|1999
| style="text-align:center;"|Dissol.
| style="text-align:center;"|2003
| style="text-align:center;"|+ / —
| style="text-align:center;"|#
| style="text-align:center;"|%
| style="text-align:center;"|Change

|align=left|New Democratic
|align=left|Gary Doer
|align="right"|57
|align="right"|32
|align="right"|31
|align="right"|35
|align="right"|+3
|align="right"|195,425
|align="right"|49.47%
|align="right"|+4.96%

|align=left|Progressive Conservative
|align=left|Stuart Murray
|align="right"|57
|align="right"|24
|align="right"|23
|align="right"|20
|align="right"|−4
|align="right"|142,967
|align="right"|36.19%
|align="right"|−4.65%

|align=left|Liberal
|align=left|Jon Gerrard
|align="right"|57
|align="right"|1
|align="right"|1
|align="right"|2
|align="right"|+1
|align="right"|52,123 	
|align="right"|13.19%
|align="right"|−0.21%

|align=left|Markus Buchart
|align="right"|14
|align="right"|0
|align="right"|0
|align="right"|0
|align="right"|—
|align="right"|3,792 	
|align="right"|0.96%
|align="right"|+0.76%

|align=left|Darrell Rankin
|align="right"|5
|align="right"|0
|align="right"|0
|align="right"|0
|align="right"|—
|align="right"|334
|align="right"|0.08%
|align="right"|−0.01%

|align=left|Chris Buors
|align="right"|5
|align="right"|0
|align="right"|0
|align="right"|0
|align="right"|—
|align="right"|248
|align="right"|0.06%
|align="right"|-0.07%

| colspan="2" style="text-align:left;"|Independents and no affiliation
|align="right"|2
|align="right"|0
|align="right"|1
|align="right"|0
|align="right"|—
|align="right"|167
|align="right"|0.04%
|align="right"|−0.19%

| style="text-align:left;" colspan="4"|Vacant
|align="right"|2
| style="text-align:center;" colspan="5"| 
|-
| style="text-align:left;" colspan="3"|Total
| style="text-align:right;"|196
| style="text-align:right;"|57
| style="text-align:right;"|57
| style="text-align:right;"|57
| style="text-align:right;"|—
| style="text-align:right;"|397,069
| style="text-align:right;"|54.17%
| style="text-align:right;"| 
|-
| style="text-align:left;" colspan="8"|Registered Voters
|align="right"|732,946
| style="text-align:center;" colspan="5"| 
|}

1 One of the two independent candidates is a member of the federal Christian Heritage Party, while the other was formerly a candidate of the Libertarian Party.

Candidates by Riding
Party key:

PC:  Progressive Conservative Party of Manitoba
L:  Manitoba Liberal Party
NDP:  New Democratic Party of Manitoba
G: Manitoba Green Party
Comm:  Communist Party of Canada - Manitoba
Lbt: Libertarian Party of Manitoba
Ind: Independent

Election expenditures refer only to candidate expenses.

Northern Manitoba/Parkland

|-
| style="background:whitesmoke;"|Dauphin-Roblin
||
|Stan Struthers 4602 (54.27%)
|
|Bill Griffin 2979 (35.13%)
|
|Joelle Robinson 683 (8.05%)
|
|Larry Powell 216 (2.55%)
|
|
||
|Stan Struthers
|-
| style="background:whitesmoke;"|Flin Flon
||
|Gerard Jennissen  2402 (73.21%)
|
|Lloyd Macdonald 322 (9.81%)
|
|Garry Zamzow  557 (16.98%)
|
|
|
|
||
|Gerrard Jennissen
|-
| style="background:whitesmoke;"|Rupertsland
||
|Eric Robinson 2203 (87.52%)
|
|Cory Phillips 152 (6.04%)
|
|Orville Woodford 162 (6.44%)
|
|
|
|
||
|Eric Robinson
|-
| style="background:whitesmoke;"|Swan River
||
|Rosann Wowchuk 4701 (63.00%)
|
|Jason Shaw 2223 (29.79%)
|
|Russell McKay 538 (7.21%)
|
|
|
|
||
|Rosann Wowchuk
|-
| style="background:whitesmoke;"|The Pas
||
|Oscar Lathlin  3104 (65.61%)
|
|Richard Goudy 791 (16.72%)
|
|Mark Sweeny 836 (17.67%)
|
|
|
|
||
|Oscar Lathlin
|-
| style="background:whitesmoke;"|Thompson
||
|Steve Ashton 3291 (82.73%)
|
|Bill Archer 532 (13.37%)
|
|Myrle Traverse 155 (3.90%)
|
|
|
|
||
|Steve Ashton
|}

Westman

|-
| style="background:whitesmoke;"|Arthur-Virden
|
|Perry Kalynuk 3,219 (41.89%)
||
|Larry Maguire 4,135 (53.80%)
|
|Vaughn Ramsay 331 (4.31%)
|
|
|
|
||
|Larry Maguire
|-
| style="background:whitesmoke;"|Brandon East
||
|Drew Caldwell 3,870 (62.04%)
|
|Greg Dinsdale 2,036 (32.64%)
|
|Scott Brigden 274 (4.39%)
|
|
|
|Lisa Gallagher (Communist) 58 (0.93%)
||
|Drew Caldwell
|-
| style="background:whitesmoke;"|Brandon West
||
|Scott Smith 5,210 (61.02%)
|
|Reg Atkinson 2,982 (34.93%)
|
|Candace Sigurdson 346 (4.05%)
|
|
|
|
||
|Scott Smith
|-
| style="background:whitesmoke;"|Minnedosa
|
|Harvey Paterson 3,247 (47.19%)
||
|Leanne Rowat 3,259 (47.37%)
|
|Gordon Powell 268 (3.90%)
|
|
|
|Colin Atkins (Independent) 106 (1.54%)
||
|Harold Gilleshammer
|-
| style="background:whitesmoke;"|Russell
|
|Don Yanick  3,208 (40.78%)
||
|Len Derkach 4,087 (51.96%)
|
|Joan Clement  571 (7.26%)
|
|
|
|
||
|Len Derkach
|}

Central Manitoba

|-
| style="background:whitesmoke;"|Carman
|
|Bill Harrison  1,445 (21.27%)
||
|Denis Rocan 3,523 (51.86%)
|
|Don Oldcorn  1,825 (26.87%)
|
|
|
|
||
|Denis Rocan†
|-
| style="background:whitesmoke;"|Gimli
||
|Peter Bjornson 5,500 (56.56%)
|
|Vern Sabeski 3,651 (37.54%)
|
|Lynn Clark 574 (5.90%)
|
|
|
|
||
|Ed Helwer
|-
| style="background:whitesmoke;"|Interlake
||
|Tom Nevakshonoff 3,858 (63.76%)
|
|Betty Green 1,796 (29.68%)
|
|Leslie Jacobson 397 (6.56%)
|
|
|
|
||
|Tom Nevakshonoff
|-
| style="background:whitesmoke;"|Lakeside
|
|Robert Marshall 3,015 (38.85%)
||
|Ralph Eichler 4,110 (52.96%)
|
|Louis Allain 636 (8.19%)
|
|
|
|
||
|Harry Enns
|-
| style="background:whitesmoke;"|Morris
|
|John Auger 1,588 (22.71%)
||
|Mavis Taillieu 3,996 (57.16%)
|
|Michael van Walleghem 1,407 (20.13%)
|
|
|
|
||
|Frank Pitura
|-
| style="background:whitesmoke;"|Pembina
|
|Mary Johnson 877 (14.24%)
||
|Peter George Dyck 4,694 (76.24%)
|
|Marilyn Skubovious 505 (8.20%)
|
|
|
|Aaron Crossman (Communist) 81 (1.32%)
||
|Peter George Dyck
|-
| style="background:whitesmoke;"|Portage la Prairie
|
|Bob Kriski 3,023 (42.73%)
||
|David Faurschou 3,524 (49.82%)
|
|Mike Lefebvre 527 (7.45%)
|
|
|
|
||
|David Faurschou
|-
| style="background:whitesmoke;"|Selkirk
||
|Greg Dewar 4,580 (62.69%)
|
|Doug Neal 1,257 (17.20%)
|
|Jack Jonasson 1,469 (20.11%)
|
|
|
|
||
|Greg Dewar
|-
| style="background:whitesmoke;"|Ste. Rose
|
|John Harapiak 2,301 (35.14%)
||
|Glen Cummings 3,709 (56.64%)
|
|Wendy Menzies 538 (8.22%)
|
|
|
|
||
|Glen Cummings†
|-
| style="background:whitesmoke;"|Turtle Mountain
|
|Lonnie Patterson 1,893 (28.72%)
||
|Merv Tweed 3,956 (60.01%)
|
|Bev Leadbeater 743 (11.27%)
|
|
|
|
||
|Merv Tweed
|}

Eastman

|-
| style="background:whitesmoke;"|Emerson
|
|Luc Gendreau 1,137 (19.25%)
||
|Jack Penner 3,509 (59.41%)
|
|Len Schieman 1,260 (21.34%)
|
|
|
|
||
|Jack Penner†
|-
| style="background:whitesmoke;"|Lac du Bonnet
|
|Michael Hameluck 3,875 (45.35%)
||
|Gerald Hawranik 4,380 (51.26%)
|
|Cheryl Appleyard 290 (3.39%)
|
|
|
|
||
|Gerald Hawranik
|-
| style="background:whitesmoke;"|La Verendrye
||
|Ron Lemieux 3,881 (58.07%)
|
|Gerard Simard 2,310 (34.57%)
|
|Paula Ryplanski Marsch 492 (7.36%)
|
|
|
|
||
|Ron Lemieux
|-
| style="background:whitesmoke;"|Springfield
|
|Georgine Spooner 2,512 (30.97%)
||
|Ron Schuler 4,917 (60.62%)
|
|Vince Boileau 682 (8.41%)
|
|
|
|
||
|Ron Schuler
|-
| style="background:whitesmoke;"|Steinbach
|
|Bonnie Schmidt  875 (15.24%)
||
|Kelvin Goertzen  4,284 (74.63%)
|
|Monica Guetre  455 (7.93%)
|
|Connie Jantz  126 (2.20%)
|
|
||
|Jim Penner
|}

Northwest Winnipeg

|-
| style="background:whitesmoke;"|Burrows
||
|Doug Martindale  4,004 (69.01%)
|
|Derek Lambert  423 (7.29%)
|
|Tony Sanchez  1,252 (21.58%)
|
|Catherine Johannson  123 (2.12%)
|
|
||
|Doug Martindale
|-
| style="background:whitesmoke;"|Inkster
|
|Mario Santos  2,851 (41.46%)
|
|Michael Ledarney  251 (3.65%)
||
|Kevin Lamoureux  3,671 (53.39%)
|
|Mario Ducusin  103 (1.50%)
|
|
||
|Becky Barrett
|-
| style="background:whitesmoke;"|Kildonan
||
|Dave Chomiak 5,123 (70.13%)
|
|Garreth McDonald 1,100 (15.06%)
|
|Michael Lazar 942 (12.90%)
|
|Frank Luschak 140 (1.92%)
|
|
||
|Dave Chomiak
|-
| style="background:whitesmoke;"|Point Douglas
||
|George Hickes  2,877 (74.86%)
|
|Wyatt McIntyre  337 (8.77%)
|
|Mary Lou Bourgeois  547 (14.23%)
|
| 
|
|Darrell Rankin (Communist)  82 (2.14%)
||
|George Hickes
|-
| style="background:whitesmoke;"|St. Johns
||
|Gord Mackintosh 4,224 (72.40%)
|
|Ray Garnett 612 (10.49%)
|
|Ed Kolodziej 745 (12.77%)
|
|Alon Weinberg 221 (3.79%)
|
|Chris Buors (Libertarian) 32 (0.55%)
||
|Gord Mackintosh
|-
| style="background:whitesmoke;"|The Maples
||
|Cris Aglugub 3,781 (68.12%)
|
|Tammy Witko 885 (15.94%)
|
|Angelina Olivier-Job 885 (15.94%)
|
|
|
|
||
|Cris Aglugub†
|-
| style="background:whitesmoke;"|Wellington
||
|Conrad Santos  3,119 (73.96%)
|
|Jon Penner  413 (9.79%)
|
|Rylan Reed  640 (15.18%)
|
|
|
|Glen Wreggitt (Communist) 45 (1.07%)
||
|Conrad Santos
|}

Northeast Winnipeg

|-
| style="background:whitesmoke;"|Concordia
||
|Gary Doer 4,450 (76.67%)
|
|Conor Lloyd 935 (16.11%)
|
|Tanya Parks 419 (7.22%)
|
|
|
|
||
|Gary Doer
|-
| style="background:whitesmoke;"|Elmwood
||
|Jim Maloway 3,954 (65.92%)
|
|Bryan McLeod 1,229 (20.49%)
|
|Walt Roberts 748 (12.47%)
|
|
|
|Gavin Whittaker (Libertarian) 67 (1.12%)
||
|Jim Maloway
|-
| style="background:whitesmoke;"|Radisson
||
|Bidhu Jha 3,888 (52.45%)
|
|Linda West 2,901 (39.13%)
|
|Murray Cliff 624 (8.42%)
|
|
|
|
||
|Bidhu Jha
|-
| style="background:whitesmoke;"|River East
|
|Doug Longstaffe 4,402 (45.75%)
||
|Bonnie Mitchelson 4,935 (51.28%)
|
|Fred Curry 286 (2.97%)
|
|
|
|
||
|Bonnie Mitchelson
|-
| style="background:whitesmoke;"|Rossmere
||
|Harry Schellenberg  5,057 (65.55%)
|
|Virginia Larsson  2,296 (29.76%)
|
|Sam Bhalesar  362 (4.69%)
|
|
|
|
||
|Harry Schellenberg†
|-
| style="background:whitesmoke;"|St. Boniface
||
|Greg Selinger 4,904 (74.34%)
|
|Dan Zahari 741 (11.23%)
|
|Dougald Lamont 952 (14.43%)
|
|
|
|
||
|Greg Selinger
|-
| style="background:whitesmoke;"|Transcona
||
|Daryl Reid 4,414 (69.48%)
|
|Nansy Marsiglia 915 (14.40%)
|
|Betty Ann Watts 1,024 (16.12%)
|
|
|
|
||
|Daryl Reid
|}

West Winnipeg

|-
| style="background:whitesmoke;"|Assiniboia
||
|Jim Rondeau  5,147 (63.05%)
|
|Dennis Wishanski  2,257 (27.65%)
|
|Monique Graboski  657 (8.05%)
|
|Jessie Tottle  102 (1.25%)
|
|
||
|Jim Rondeau
|-
| style="background:whitesmoke;"|Charleswood
|
|Mel Willis 1,436 (17.52%)
||
|Myrna Driedger 3,961 (48.32%)
|
|Rick Ross 2,800 (34.16%)
|
|
|
|
||
|Myrna Driedger
|-
| style="background:whitesmoke;"|Kirkfield Park
|
|Dennis Kshyk 2,855 (31.06%)
||
|Stuart Murray 4,294 (46.72%)
|
|Brian Head 2,042 (22.22%)
|
|
|
|
||
|Stuart Murray
|-
| style="background:whitesmoke;"|St. James
||
|Bonnie Korzeniowski 3,982 (53.68%)
|
|Cliff Allbutt 2,473 (33.34%)
|
|Alana McKenzie 963 (12.98%)
|
|
|
|
||
|Bonnie Korzeniowski
|-
| style="background:whitesmoke;"|Tuxedo
|
|Sonia Taylor  2,023 (25.36%)
||
|Heather Stefanson 4,213 (52.81%)
|
|Marla Billinghurst  1,741 (21.83%)
|
|
|
|
||
|Heather Stefanson
|}

Central Winnipeg

|-
| style="background:whitesmoke;"|Fort Rouge
||
|Tim Sale 4,118 (57.64%)
|
|Mark Francis 1,409 (19.72%)
|
|David Henteleff 1,212 (16.96%)
|
|Mikel Magnusson 355 (4.97%)
|
|Jim Weidman (Libertarian) 51 (0.71%) 
||
|Tim Sale†
|-
| style="background:whitesmoke;"|Lord Roberts
||
|Diane McGifford 4,352 (61.99%)
|
|Andrew Hymers 1,179 (16.79%)
|
|Ali Lamont 982 (13.99%)
|
|Vere Scott 442 (6.29%)
|
|Andy Caisse (Libertarian) 66 (0.94%)
||
|Diane McGifford
|-
| style="background:whitesmoke;"|Minto
||
|MaryAnn Mihychuk 3,586 (69.47%)
|
|David Laurence 626 (12.13%)
|
|Mario Javier 685 (13.27%)
|
|Joan Johannson 197 (3.81%)
|
|Cheryl-Anne Carr (Communist) 68 (1.32%)
||
|MaryAnn Mihychuk
|-
| style="background:whitesmoke;"|River Heights
|
|Kristin Bingeman 1,824 (19.74%)
|
|Mike Radcliffe 2,675 (28.95%)
||
|Jon Gerrard 4,500 (48.70%)
|
|Linda Goosen 209 (2.26%)
|
|Clancy Smith (Libertarian) 32 (0.35%)
||
|Jon Gerrard
|-
| style="background:whitesmoke;"|Wolseley
||
|Rob Altemeyer 3,482 (56.90%)
|
|Ashley Burner 679 (11.09%)
|
|Val Mollison 766 (12.52%)
|
|Markus Buchart 1,193 (19.49%)
|
|
||
|Jean Friesen
|}

South Winnipeg

|-
| style="background:whitesmoke;"|Fort Garry
||
|Kerri Irvin-Ross 3,852 (46.75%)
|
|Joy Smith 3,765 (45.69%)
|
|Taran Malik 562 (6.82%)
|
|
|
|Didz Zuzens (Independent) 61 (1.12%)
||
|Joy Smith
|-
| style="background:whitesmoke;"|Fort Whyte
|
|Janine Ballingall Scotten 2,647 (28.13%)
||
|John Loewen 4,960 (52.71%)
|
|Gerry Sankar 1,803 (19.16%) 
|
|
|
|
||
|John Loewen
|-
| style="background:whitesmoke;"|Riel
||
|Christine Melnick 4,455 (54.03%)
|
|Shirley Render 3,119 (37.83%)
|
|Kristopher Ade 671 (8.14%)
|
|
|
|
||
|Linda Asper
|-
| style="background:whitesmoke;"|Seine River
||
|Theresa Oswald 4,314 (51.06%)
|
|Louise Dacquay 3,582 (42.40%)
|
|Luciano Vacca 553 (6.54%)
|
|
|
|
||
|Louise Dacquay
|-
| style="background:whitesmoke;"|Southdale
|
|Carolyn Frost 3,123 (36.04%)
||
|Jack Reimer 4,422 (51.03%)
|
|Chuck Mrena 1,120 (12.93%)
|
|
|
|
||
|Jack Reimer
|-
| style="background:whitesmoke;"|St. Norbert
||
|Marilyn Brick 3,355 (48.68%)
|
|Marcel Laurendeau 2,610 (37.87%)
|
|Jocelyn Greenwood 741 (10.75%)
|
|Keith Barber 186 (2.70%)
|
|
||
|Marcel Laurendeau
|-
| style="background:whitesmoke;"|St. Vital
||
|Nancy Allan 4,409 (63.43%)
|
|Kirsty Reilly 1,656 (23.82%)
|
|Justin Beaudry 707 (10.17%)
|
|Nelson Morrison 179 (2.58%)
|
|
||
|Nancy Allan
|}

Post-election changes
MaryAnn Mihychuk (Minto) resigned her seat on May 21, 2004 to campaign for Mayor of Winnipeg.  A by-election was held on June 22, 2004 to determine her successor.

Merv Tweed (Turtle Mountain) resigned his seat to campaign for the House of Commons of Canada.  A by-election was held on July 2, 2004 to determine his successor.

John Loewen (Fort Whyte) resigned his seat on September 26, 2005 to campaign for the House of Commons of Canada.  A by-election was held on December 16, 2005, to determine his successor.

See also
Independent candidates, 2003 Manitoba provincial election

References

Further reading

External links
CBC: Manitoba votes 2003
Election Almanac – Manitoba Provincial Election [permanent dead link]
Elections Manitoba
Manitoba legislature
Manitoba Government

2003 elections in Canada
2003
2003 in Manitoba
June 2003 events in Canada